Il diavolo sulle colline is a 1985 Italian drama film directed by Vittorio Cottafavi. It was screened in the Un Certain Regard section at the 1985 Cannes Film Festival.

Cast
 Roberto Accornero
 Urbano Barberini
 Matteo Corvino
 Alessandro Fontana
 Daniela Silverio
 Kristina Van Eyck

References

External links

1985 films
1980s Italian-language films
1985 drama films
Films directed by Vittorio Cottafavi
Italian drama films
1980s Italian films